A rubric is a word or section of text in red for emphasis.

Rubric may also refer to:

 Rubric (academic), a set of criteria for grading assignments
 Rubric (translation organisation), a global language service provider

See also
 Rubik (disambiguation)